Caleb Meakins (Amharic: ካሌብ ሜኪንስ; 1989 – 28 February 2020) was an Ethiopian-born British entrepreneur, motivational speaker, and YouTube personality.

Early life and career
Caleb was a born in 1989 to an Ethiopian mother, Ruth and British father Andy in Ethiopia. He had two sisters named Lydia and Abigail. Caleb moved London after his father death in 1996 Ethiopian Airlines accident. After graduating university, Caleb sought to establish enterprise offered by various non-profit organization in the United Kingdom, such as Goldman Sachs, Ogilvy and Mathers. In 2013, the Loughborough University named him "Graduate of the Year" for his effort in competition run by UK job sites Adzuna and Milkround. Aside from being entrepreneur, he was versatile motivational speaker. One of Caleb's contribution of organization named My 40 Days, a social venture aimed to overcome fear of failure. Caleb entered YouTube personality after learning eskista (an Ethiopian dance), which is revealed received 1.8 million views on YouTube. He ventured various non-profit organizations; he was co-founder of Shift, a British Christian movement. As a devoted Christian, the institution has registered 350 young adults, which put Swift new generation "to put their faith in Jesus and shape society, whatever their sphere of influence."

Upon returning to Addis Ababa, he founded Bake & Brew and Mella, which encourage entrepreneurship in Ethiopia. He gave a speech once in a TED talk regarding the concept of "facing fear of failure" with 87,000 views. In addition, he created a YouTube channel named "Ethiopia In Me" in 2016, promoting the Ethiopian culture, and against migration and brain drainage.

Death
On 20 February 2020, Caleb was fatally injured in a car crash, en route to Bole International Airport in Addis Ababa. A homeless man took Caleb to the nearest Korea Hospital, despite the emergency treatment costing 70,000 birr. Similarity, treatment at St. Paul's Hospital was too expensive. He died in hospital on the eighth day. An autopsy report concluded that Caleb died from a severe head injury with skull fracture in left side of back and caught cervical vertebrae. He also had a lung infection. Caleb remained otherwise resilient after surgeons removed blood clot in his back and insert chest drains in his lung, but then quickly deteriorated into critical condition. 

On 28 February, his family announced his death on social media:
Hey friends, we come with heavy hearts to share with you all that our dear Caleb went to be with our Heavenly Father at 17:40 today and is now in glory. He passed away peacefully and without any pain. We are all still shock. This doesn't feel real. We are feeling such deep pain and sorrow but feel comfort that he has been reunited with his creator and is now in glory. Join us while we grieve and thank God for Caleb's life and the huge impact he has had on all our lives We love you, Meakins family.
Vigil observance was held on 2 March in International Evangelical Church in Addis Ababa.

References

1989 births
2020 deaths
British businesspeople
Ethiopian businesspeople
British motivational speakers
Ethiopian Christians
Ethiopian people of British descent
British people of Ethiopian descent
Road incident deaths in Ethiopia
2020s road incidents in Africa